The Q Public License (QPL) is a non-copyleft license, created by Trolltech for its free edition of the Qt. It was used until Qt 3.0, as Trolltech toolkit version 4.0 was released under GPL version 2.

It fails the Debian Free Software Guidelines, used by several Linux distributions, though it qualifies for the Free Software Foundation's Free Software Definition; however, it is not compatible with the FSF's GNU General Public License, meaning that products derived from code under both the GPL and the QPL cannot be redistributed.

History 
KDE, a desktop environment for Linux, is based on Qt. Only the free open source edition of Qt was covered by the QPL; the commercial edition, which is functionally equal, is under a pay-per-use license and could not be freely distributed. Meanwhile, the Free Software Foundation and authors of the GPL objected to the QPL as it was a non-copyleft license incompatible with the GPL. As KDE grew in popularity, the free software community urged Trolltech to license Qt under the GPL to ensure that it would remain free software forever and could be used and developed by commercial third parties. Eventually, under pressure, Trolltech dual-licensed the free edition of Qt 2.2 for use under the terms of the GPL or the QPL.

Adoption 
Other projects that have adopted the Q Public License, sometimes with a change in the choice of jurisdiction clause, include:

 LibreSource is a versatile collaborative platform provided by artenum and dedicated to collaborative software development
 Jpgraph is a graph generation tool written in PHP that dynamically produces charts and graphs as image files for presentation on websites.
 Hercules, a software implementation of the System/370, ESA/390, and z/Architecture mainframe computer architectures.
 Tgif switched from a free-of-charge non-commercial license to the Q Public License.

Previous projects using the Q Public License include:

 The OCaml compiler and related tools from Projet Cristal at INRIA. Since April 2016 OCaml is released under the GNU Lesser General Public License version 2.1 with linking exception.
 CGAL for versions 3.x. The CGAL library is released under GNU General Public License/LGPL since CGAL version 4.0 (March 2012).

The Debian project rejects software covered by solely QPL (and not dual licensed with something else like the GPL) because of:

 A choice of venue clause
 Forced distribution to a third party
 Forced blanket license to the original developer

Compliance 
All legal disputes about the license are settled in Oslo, Norway, but it has never been legally contested.

See also 

 Open source license

References

External links
 The Q Public License, version 1.0

Free and open-source software licenses
Qt (software)